Daniel Lajud Martínez (born 22 January 1999) is a professional footballer who plays as an attacking midfielder for Liga de Expansión MX club Atlante and the Lebanon national team.

Coming through the youth system, Lajud began his senior career with Monterrey, scoring on his Liga MX debut in 2018. He was sent on loan to fellow Liga MX clubs Querétaro and Puebla in 2019, before moving to Liga de Expansión MX side Querétaro in 2020, with whom he won the Guardianes 2020. After a one-season spell at Raya2, Monterrey's reserve team, Lajud left Monterrey for Atlante in 2022, winning the Apertura 2022 in his first season at the club.

Born in Mexico, Lajud is of Lebanese descent through his father; he was called up to the Lebanon national team in 2022.

Club career

Monterrey and loans 
Lajud joined Monterrey's youth academy in 2014, progressing through their under-15, under-17 and under-20 teams. He registered to Monterrey's senior team in the Clausura 2018 Copa MX, making his competitive debut on 20 February 2018, in a 2–1 win against Dorados. Lajud made his league debut in the Liga MX on 20 October 2018 in a 2–1 win against Toluca; he was substituted in during the 72nd minute and scored the winning goal in the 84th minute.

In January 2019, Lajud was sent on loan to Querétaro in the Liga de Expansión MX, and then to Puebla six months later. In January 2020, Lajud moved to Tampico Madero on loan, with whom he won the Guardianes 2020. During the 2021–22 season, Lajud played for Raya2, Monterrey's reserve team in the Liga de Expansión MX. He was released by Monterrey in summer 2022.

Atlante 
On 28 June 2022, Lajud joined Atlante. He made his debut two days later as a starter in a 3–0 home win against Atlético La Paz; after the end of the match, Lajud proposed to his girlfriend. On 13 July, Lajud scored his first goal for Atlante in a 3–1 win against Cancún. He scored consecutive braces in a 5–0 win against Tlaxcala and a 2–2 draw against Cimarrones de Sonora, on 5 and 8 September, respectively. After defeating Celaya in the final, Layun helped Atlante win the Apertura 2022.

In the first matchday of the Clausura 2023, Lajud scored a brace against Alebrijes de Oaxaca in a 4–0 win on 5 January 2023. He scored another brace on 31 January, helping his side win 3–0 against Mineros de Zacatecas.

International career
On 19 September 2022, he obtained a Lebanese passport in order to play for the Lebanon national team. Lajud was first called up by coach Aleksandar Ilić ahead of Lebanon's friendly fixture against Kuwait in Dubai, United Arab Emirates on 19 November 2022. He made his debut as a starter, with the match ending in a 2–0 defeat.

Style of play
Lajud is an attacking midfielder known for his speed and powerful mid-range shooting.

Personal life
Lajud is of Lebanese descent through his father.

Lajud's brother, Rodrigo, is also a footballer. On 30 June 2022, he proposed to his girlfriend at Estadio Ciudad de los Deportes, Atlante's home stadium, following his club debut.

Career statistics

Club

International

Honours
Tampico Madero
 Liga de Expansión MX: Guardianes 2020

Atlante
 Liga de Expansión MX: Apertura 2022

See also
 List of Lebanon international footballers born outside Lebanon

References

External links
 
 
 
 

1999 births
Living people
Footballers from Veracruz
Mexican people of Lebanese descent
Sportspeople of Lebanese descent
Citizens of Lebanon through descent
Lebanese people of Mexican descent
Mexican footballers
Lebanese footballers
Association football midfielders
C.F. Monterrey players
Querétaro F.C. footballers
Club Puebla players
Tampico Madero F.C. footballers
Raya2 Expansión players
Atlante F.C. footballers
Liga MX players
Liga de Expansión MX players
Lebanon international footballers